Natasya Beteyob, sometimes written as Natasha Beteyob (born 10 September 2000) is an Indonesian weightlifter. She won the gold medal in the women's 55kg event at the 2021 Islamic Solidarity Games held in Konya, Turkey. She won the bronze medal in the women's 55kg event at the 2021 Southeast Asian Games held in Hanoi, Vietnam.

She won the bronze medal in the women's 59kg event at the 2022 Asian Weightlifting Championships held in Manama, Bahrain. She competed in the women's 59kg event at the 2022 World Weightlifting Championships held in Bogotá, Colombia.

Achievements

References

External links 
 

Living people
2000 births
Place of birth missing (living people)
Indonesian female weightlifters
Islamic Solidarity Games medalists in weightlifting
Islamic Solidarity Games competitors for Indonesia
Southeast Asian Games medalists in weightlifting
Southeast Asian Games bronze medalists for Indonesia
Competitors at the 2021 Southeast Asian Games
21st-century Indonesian women